Sam Jones is a Los Angeles-based photographer and director whose portraits of U.S. President Barack Obama, Sandra Bullock, George Clooney, Bob Dylan, Kristen Stewart, Robert Downey Jr., Amy Adams, and Jack Nicholson have appeared on the covers of Vanity Fair, Rolling Stone, Esquire, GQ, Time, Entertainment Weekly and Men's Journal.

His photos have received numerous awards from American Photography, Communication Arts and Life magazine's respected Eisie award; and his image for the cover of Wilco's Yankee Hotel Foxtrot was published in "The Greatest Album Covers of All Time".  His collection of candid celebrity portraiture, The Here And Now: The Photographs of Sam Jones, was published by HarperCollins.  Other published works include Non-Fiction, a collection of cinematic portraiture, and Some Where Else, a photographic book and musical collaboration with musician Blake Mills.

Jones has created numerous national commercials for Skype, Sonos, Canon, Target, Dove and many others. Jones' is a sought after music video director who won MTV's music video of the year for Foo Fighters "Walk." He has directed videos for Mumford and Sons, Tom Petty, John Mayer, and many others. He also directed the multi-award-winning interactive video for Cold War Kids' "I've Seen Enough". He won the IAA Responsibility Award for his AD Council "Everyone Knows" PSA. He has also directed the ABC television show, Cougar Town.

In 2013 Jones launched Off Camera with Sam Jones on DirecTV's Audience Network. Off Camera is an hour long show created out of his passion for long form conversational interviews. Via worldwide broadcast, online magazine, and podcast, Jones shares his conversations with the artists, actors, and musicians who fascinate and inspire him most. Robert Downey Jr., Sarah Silverman, Dave Grohl, Laura Dern, Tony Hawk, Matt Damon and Will Ferrell have all appeared on the show.

Most recently, Jones directed the feature length Showtime documentary Lost Songs: The Basement Tapes Continued, a film that reexamines Bob Dylan's Basement Tapes and documents new recordings of lost Dylan lyrics by Elvis Costello, Marcus Mumford and others in Capitol Records Studios. The film features Bob Dylan as narrator, and documents the exciting collaboration between some of the most successful current artists in music and a 26-year-old Bob Dylan. The film airs November 21 on Showtime Networks. Jones's other documentary work includes I Am Trying to Break Your Heart: A Film About Wilco.

Selected works

References

External links
 

Photographers from California
Commercial photographers
Fashion photographers
Living people
Documentary photographers
American film directors
American music video directors
Year of birth missing (living people)